Ahane GAA is a Gaelic Athletic Association club located in the Ahane, Castleconnell and Montpelier areas of east County Limerick, Republic of Ireland.  The club fields teams in both hurling and football and historically is regarded as one of the great clubs of Limerick. Some other class players were the Mackey brothers, Mick and John and Jackie Power among others. A few of the Ahane players won the All-Ireland Senior hurling championship in 1934, 1936 and 1940 with Limerick, their leader being the peerless Mick Mackey, regarded as one of Ireland's greatest hurlers of all time. They won 15 Limerick Senior Hurling Championships in the 1930s and 1940s and also won 5 Limerick Senior Football Championships during this era.

Hurling

Honours

 Limerick Senior Hurling Championship:  19
 1931, 1933, 1934, 1935, 1936, 1937, 1938, 1939, 1942, 1943, 1944, 1945, 1946, 1947, 1948, 1955, 1998, 1999, 2004
 Limerick Junior Hurling Championship: 2
 1928, 1930
 Limerick Minor Hurling Championship: 4 
 1930, 1940, 1991, 2014

Gaelic football

Honours
 Limerick Senior Football Championship: 5
 1935, 1936, 1937, 1938, 1939

Further reading

 Come on Ahane The Spuds are Boiling by Sean Murphy, 2002.

References

External links
Ahane GAA site (archived 2007)

Gaelic games clubs in County Limerick
Hurling clubs in County Limerick
Gaelic football clubs in County Limerick